Dzina Sazanavets (born 25 October 1990 in Klichaw, Belarus) is a weightlifter representing Belarus. She was placed fourth at the 2012 Summer Olympics at the women's 69 kg event, just after her country-mate Maryna Shkermankova.  In October 2016, the IOC disqualified her from the 2012 Olympics and annulled her result after her Olympic doping sample was retested and failed.

References

1990 births
Living people
World Weightlifting Championships medalists
Belarusian female weightlifters
Olympic weightlifters of Belarus
Weightlifters at the 2012 Summer Olympics
Doping cases in weightlifting
Belarusian sportspeople in doping cases
European Weightlifting Championships medalists
20th-century Belarusian women
21st-century Belarusian women